Microtubule associated serine/threonine kinase 3 is a protein that in humans is encoded by the MAST3 gene.

References

External links 
 PDBe-KB provides an overview of all the structure information available in the PDB for Human Microtubule-associated serine/threonine-protein kinase 3

Further reading